The Cathedral of the Intercession of the Holy Virgin is a Russian Orthodox cathedral in Shakhty, Rostov Oblast, Russia that belongs to the Diocese of Shakhty and Millerovo and was built in 1902.

History

The Cathedral of the Intercession of the Holy Virgin in Alexandrovsk-Grushevsky town (present-day Shakhty) was built in 1902 in Eclecticist style. According to 1909 data, the cathedral had about 4,000 parishioners, a parochial school with 100 students, and a library.

In 1922, all of the cathedral property was nationalized. The temple was closed a year later along with two other churches in the town. In February 1933, the bells of cathedral were sent to the remelting, the dome of and bell tower were destroyed. The cathedral building had been used as a repair shop for tram depot until late 1990s.

In 1997, tram depot was visited by Bishop of Rostov and Novocherkassk Panteleimon, who gave his blessing to revive the cathedral. Reconstruction works began in the fall of 1998. No old drafts of the cathedral has been preserved, so the builders had to rely on photos taken in 1912. The construction of the revived cathedral underwent substantial changes: a 33-meter high bell tower and two aisles were attached to the building.

References

Churches in Rostov Oblast
Russian Orthodox cathedrals in Russia
Churches completed in 1902
Demolished churches in the Soviet Union
Rebuilt churches in Russia
Cultural heritage monuments in Rostov Oblast